Aizliegtais paņēmiens (lat. The Forbidden Method) is a Latvian investigative news program produced by Latvijas Televīzija (LTV). Its creator and host is journalist Guntis Bojārs. Every program is divided into two segments: Operation and Discussion. During the Operation segment LTV journalists use both public information and hidden camera to research a popular subject in Latvia. During the Discussion segment host Guntis Bojārs interviews usually 3 experts or politicians on their observations while watching the Operation.

Title sequence
Each episode begins with a brief description of the program. Riga landscape and passersby are shown, but these frames are accelerated. Background music is played. Almost all the series (except for specials) begin with the following introductory phrase read by Aigars Rozenbergs:

Series overview

Awards
In 2017 the five episode special Operācija: "Tokija" (lit. Operation: Tokyo) gained Employers’ Confederation of Latvia prize. In this special a journalist from Latvijas Televīzija worked in restaurant chain Tokyo City and documented using a hidden camera a sustained tax evasion scheme.

References

External links
 Official website 
 Facebook account 

2010s Latvian television series
2013 Latvian television series debuts
Latvijas Televīzija original programming